The FIBA Oceania Championship for Men 1987 was the qualifying tournament of FIBA Oceania for the 1988 Summer Olympics. The tournament was held in Timaru and Christchurch. For the first time, a team other than Australia and New Zealand competed after French Polynesia decided to send a team to the tournament.   won its 8th consecutive Oceania Championship to qualify for Olympics.

Teams that did not enter

Results

Championship

Final standings

Australia qualified for the 1988 Summer Olympics in Seoul..

References
FIBA Archive

FIBA Oceania Championship
Championship
1987 in New Zealand basketball
1987 in Australian basketball
International basketball competitions hosted by New Zealand
Australia men's national basketball team games
New Zealand men's national basketball team games